Niesslia peltigerae is a species of lichenicolous fungus in the family Niessliaceae. It was described as a new species in 2020 by lichenologist Sergio Pérez-Ortega. The type specimen was collected in the Hoonah-Angoon Census Area of Glacier Bay National Park, in muskeg and forest. The fungus was growing parasitically on the lichen Peltigera kristinssonii, which itself was growing on mountain hemlock (Tsuga mertensiana). The specific epithet peltigerae alludes to the genus of its host. Infection by the fungus bleaches the thallus of the host lichen.

References

Niessliaceae
Fungi described in 2020
Fungi of the United States
Lichenicolous fungi
Fungi without expected TNC conservation status